Love letters is a 1924 American silent drama film directed by David Selman (credited as David Soloman) and written by Doty Hobart, which stars Shirley Mason, Gordon Edwards, and Alma Francis. John Miljan made his film debut in a supporting role.

Plot
As described in a film magazine review, Julia Crossland is living very happily with her husband and sister. Evelyn Jefferson is equally happy with the thoughts of her upcoming marriage to Jimmy Stanton, who has just accepted a position as secretary to Thomas Chadwick. He rents a house for his employer next to that of the Crossland's. When the sisters meet Thomas, they realize that he is the man they both love and secretly wrote passionate love letters to. Evelyn attempts to get the letters, but is unsuccessful. Chadwick is killed. When the Morocco box containing the letters is opened, everyone finds that the man has personally destroyed all evidence of his past amours.

Cast list
 Shirley Mason as Evelyn Jefferson
 Gordon Edwards as Jimmy Stanton
 Alma Francis as Julia Crossland
 John Miljan as Thomas Chadwick
 William Irving as Don Crossland

References

External links
 
 
 

Fox Film films
1924 drama films
1924 films
Melodrama films
Silent American drama films
Films directed by David Selman
American silent feature films
American black-and-white films
1920s English-language films
1920s American films